Anabwani (Arabic [أنبوني]), the son of Omukama Masamba, was a ruler of Bunyoro in the late 17th century.

Anabwani ruled the Central African kingdom for seven years before he was overthrown by Kyebambe, a son of his father's lesser wife. It was during his rule that there developed a greater association with the Arab traders from the Sudan. Anabwani, along with his wives and children are said to have gone into exile towards the lands to the south east of Bunyoro (towards current day Luhyaland in Kenya). Anabwani had many children from his various wives, among the most notable being Masamba (also known as Jibril) and Liaboya, a son of his old age and his favourite.

One of the most admirable things about Anabwani was his dedication to his family. When he rose to kingship, he made sure that members of his family also shared in it. He was exceedingly generous to them, often giving his siblings powerful positions in his empire. In fact, all of his siblings, except one, became rulers of various parts of the empire during his rule. Even Olimi, the brother who had abandoned his responsibility as the oldest son, was made a ruler of one of the counties within the empire. This just shows the true nature of Anabwani; he was a loving man who did not hold grudges. Anabwani had many children and all of these were raised together and went with him to exile. This can be said to be an example of his loving and caring nature. Despite the various conflicts which took place under his rule, the people of Bunyoro did surprisingly well. Their government was for the first time highly efficient, and the bureaucracy whom Anabwani had put in place worked far much better than previous governments. It is because of all these achievements, made by such a humble man, that has made Anabwani to be considered one of the greatest and most admirable, kings of Bunyoro.

It is Liaboya who after his father's death led his followers from Ebusamia to Ebunyole where he settled and became very prosperous. Liaboya's son, also named Anabwani, even managed to gain some significant political power in his adoptive home. Among those who claim descent from the younger is a significant number of the members of the Mang'ali clan of Bunyore the most prominent of which is the Anabwani family also known as the House of Anabwani. Other descendants currently reside all over Kenya and the rest of the world. Another notable descendant of Anabwani was Muhammad bin Jibril, his grandson, who went north and west into what is modern Senegal where he became a close associate of Emir Umar Tall of the Toucouleur Empire, and was a prominent military leader.

References 

Ugandan monarchies
1739 births
1828 deaths
Bunyoro
17th-century monarchs in Africa